The Pulitzer Prize for Feature Writing is one of the fourteen American Pulitzer Prizes that are annually awarded for Journalism. It has been awarded since 1979 for a distinguished example of feature writing giving prime consideration to high literary quality and originality.

Finalists have been announced from 1980, ordinarily two others beside the winner.

Winners and citations
In its first 35 years to 2013, the Feature Writing Pulitzer was awarded 34 times; none was given in 2004 and 2014, and it was never split. Gene Weingarten alone won it twice, in 2008 and 2010.

 1979: Jon D. Franklin, Baltimore Evening Sun, for 'Mrs. Kelly's Monster', "an account of brain surgery."
 1980: Madeleine Blais, Miami Herald, "for 'Zepp's Last Stand.'"
 1981: Teresa Carpenter, Village Voice, for Death of a Playmate, "her account of the death of actress-model Dorothy Stratten."  (The prize in this category was originally awarded to Janet Cooke of The Washington Post, but was revoked after it was revealed that her winning story about an 8-year-old heroin addict was fabricated.)
 1982: Saul Pett, Associated Press, "for an article profiling the federal bureaucracy."
 1983: Nan C. Robertson, The New York Times, for Toxic Shock, "her memorable and medically detailed account of her struggle with toxic shock syndrome."
 1984: Peter Mark Rinearson, The Seattle Times, "for 'Making It Fly,' his 29,000-word account of the development, manufacture, and marketing of the new Boeing 757" jetliner.
 1985: Alice Steinbach, The Baltimore Sun, "for her account of a blind boy's world, 'A Boy of Unusual Vision.'"
 1986: John Camp, St. Paul Pioneer Press and Dispatch, for Life on the Land, "his five-part series examining the life of an American farm family faced with the worst U.S. agricultural crisis since the Depression."
 1987: Steve Twomey, The Philadelphia Inquirer, "for his illuminating profile of life aboard an aircraft carrier."
 1988: Jacqui Banaszynski, St. Paul Pioneer Press and Dispatch, "for her moving series about the life and death of an AIDS victim in a rural farm community."
 1989: David Zucchino, The Philadelphia Inquirer, "for his richly compelling series, 'Being Black in South Africa.'"
 1990: Dave Curtin, Colorado Springs Gazette Telegraph, "for a gripping account of a family's struggle to recover after its members were severely burned in an explosion that devastated their home."
 1991: Sheryl James, St. Petersburg Times, "for a compelling series about a mother who abandoned her newborn child and how it affected her life and those of others."
 1992: Howell Raines, The New York Times, "for 'Grady's Gift,' an account of the author's childhood friendship with his family's black housekeeper and the lasting lessons of their relationship."
 1993: George Lardner Jr., The Washington Post, "for his unflinching examination of his daughter's murder by a violent man who had slipped through the criminal justice system."
 1994: Isabel Wilkerson, The New York Times, "for her profile of a fourth-grader from Chicago's South Side and for two stories reporting on the Midwestern flood of 1993."
 1995: Ron Suskind, The Wall Street Journal, "for his stories about inner-city honor students in Washington, D.C., and their determination to survive and prosper." These articles would later become his first book "A Hope in the Unseen"
 1996: Rick Bragg, The New York Times, "for his elegantly written stories about contemporary America."
 1997: Lisa Pollak, The Baltimore Sun, "for her compelling portrait of a baseball umpire who endured the death of a son while knowing that another son suffers from the same deadly genetic disease."
 1998: Thomas French, St. Petersburg Times, "for his detailed and compassionate narrative portrait of a mother and two daughters slain on a Florida vacation, and the three-year investigation into their murders."
 1999: Angelo B. Henderson, The Wall Street Journal, "for his portrait of a druggist who is driven to violence by his encounters with armed robbery, illustrating the lasting effects of crime."
 2000: J.R. Moehringer, Los Angeles Times, for Crossing Over, "his portrait of Gee's Bend, an isolated river community in Alabama where many descendants of slaves live, and how a proposed ferry to the mainland might change it."
 2001: Tom Hallman, Jr., The Oregonian (Portland, Oregon), "for his poignant profile of a disfigured 14-year-old boy who elects to have life-threatening surgery in an effort to improve his appearance."
 2002: Barry Siegel, Los Angeles Times, for A Father's Pain, a Judge's Duty, and a Justice Beyond Their Reach, "his humane and haunting portrait of a man tried for negligence in the death of his son, and the judge who heard the case."
 2003: Sonia Nazario, Los Angeles Times, "for 'Enrique's Journey,' her touching, exhaustively reported story of a Honduran boy's perilous search for his mother who had migrated to the United States."
 2004: not awarded
 2005: Julia Keller of Chicago Tribune, "for her gripping, meticulously reconstructed account of a deadly 10-second tornado that ripped through Utica, Ill."
 2006: Jim Sheeler of Rocky Mountain News, "for his poignant story on a Marine major who helps the families of comrades killed in Iraq cope with their loss and honor their sacrifice."
 2007: Andrea Elliott of The New York Times, for 'Muslims in America Series,' "her intimate, richly textured portrait of an immigrant imam striving to find his way and serve his faithful in America."
 2008: Gene Weingarten of The Washington Post, for 'Pearls Before Breakfast,' "his chronicling of a world-class violinist who, as an experiment, played beautiful music in a subway station filled with unheeding commuters." 
 2009: Lane DeGregory of St. Petersburg Times, for 'The Girl in the Window,' "her moving, richly detailed story of a neglected little girl, found in a roach-infested room, unable to talk or feed herself, who was adopted by a new family committed to her nurturing."
 2010: Gene Weingarten of The Washington Post, for 'Fatal Distraction: Forgetting a Child in the Backseat of a Car Is a Horrifying Mistake. Is It a Crime?,' "his haunting story about parents, from varying walks of life, who accidentally kill their children by forgetting them in cars."
 2011: Amy Ellis Nutt of the Newark Star-Ledger, for 'The Wreck of the Lady Mary,' "her deeply probing story of the mysterious sinking of a commercial fishing boat in the Atlantic Ocean that drowned six men."
 2012: Eli Sanders of The Stranger (Seattle) for 'The Bravest Woman in Seattle,' "his haunting story of a woman who survived a brutal attack that took the life of her partner."
 2013: John Branch of The New York Times, for 'Snow Fall', an "evocative narrative about skiers killed in an avalanche and the science that explains such disasters" and the integration of multimedia elements.
 2014: not awarded
 2015: Diana Marcum of the Los Angeles Times for Scenes from California's Dust Bowl "her dispatches from California's Central Valley offering nuanced portraits of lives affected by the state’s drought, bringing an original and empathic perspective to the story."
 2016: Kathryn Schulz of The New Yorker for The Really Big One, "an elegant scientific narrative of the rupturing of the Cascadia fault line, a masterwork of environmental reporting and writing."
 2017: C. J. Chivers of The New York Times for 'The Fighter,' "showing, through an artful accumulation of fact and detail, that a Marine's postwar descent into violence reflected neither the actions of a simple criminal nor a stereotypical case of PTSD."
 2018: Rachel Kaadzi Ghansah, freelance reporter, GQ, for "an unforgettable portrait of murderer Dylann Roof, using a unique and powerful mix of reportage, first-person reflection and analysis of the historical and cultural forces behind his killing of nine people inside Emanuel AME Church in Charleston, S.C."
 2019: Hannah Dreier of ProPublica for a series of powerful, intimate narratives that followed Salvadoran immigrants on New York’s Long Island whose lives were shattered by a botched federal crackdown on the international criminal gang MS-13.
 2020: Ben Taub of The New Yorker for "a devastating account of a man who was kidnapped, tortured and deprived of his liberty for more than a decade at the Guantanamo Bay detention facility, blending on-the-ground reporting and lyrical prose to offer a nuanced perspective on America's wider war on terror." (Moved into contention by the Board.)
 2021: Nadja Drost, freelance contributor, The California Sunday Magazine, for "For a brave and gripping account of global migration that documents a group’s journey on foot through the Darién Gap, one of the most dangerous migrant routes in the world." Mitchell S. Jackson, freelance contributor for Runner's World, "for a deeply affecting account of the killing of Ahmaud Arbery that combined vivid writing, thorough reporting and personal experience to shed light on systemic racism in America."

2022: Jennifer Senior of The Atlantic, "For an unflinching portrait of a family’s reckoning with loss in the 20 years since 9/11, masterfully braiding the author's personal connection to the story with sensitive reporting that reveals the long reach of grief."

References

Feature Writing
Awards established in 1979